The Oxford Encyclopedia of Maritime History, by editor in chief John B. Hattendorf, was published by Oxford University Press in 2007. The work was issued in four volumes in print and online in the Oxford Digital Library. The encyclopedia is devoted to global maritime history and contains more than 950 articles written by more than 400 authors in around 50 countries.

In summarizing its contents, Oxford University Press states that:

Awards
 Professional and Scholarly Publishing Division (PSP) of the Association of American Publishers 2007 Awards for Excellence: Honorable Mention in the "Best of Multivolume Reference" Category
 Library Journal Best Reference of 2007
 North American Society for Oceanic History's 2007 John Lyman Book Award in the Reference Category

Dartmouth Medal
In January 2008, the American Library Association at its annual meeting in Philadelphia announced that it would award its Dartmouth Medal to the Encyclopedia. The ALA news release explained:
Of all the titles the Dartmouth Medal Committee considered for this year's award, one left the others in its wake. You might say it floated to the top, or that it swam past the competition. The Oxford Encyclopedia of Maritime History is the first English-language scholarly reference log of its kind. Its four volumes hold a cargo of nearly one thousand signed entries and four hundred illustrations. One can scarcely fathom the depths of its contents. It contains all the seafaring topics you may expect "Shipwrecks," "Navigators," and "Ballast" and many you may not "Film," "Terrorism," and "Religion." Not only did the international crew of naval, academic, and independent authors admirably achieve their goal of creating an interdisciplinary resource, they also made it fun. This title is destined to be the flagship resource in maritime history for years to come.

References

External links
complete online edition
 Table of contents

2007 non-fiction books
Encyclopedias of history
Books of maritime history
Naval history
Encyclopedia Of Maritime History
British encyclopedias
21st-century encyclopedias